Clair Cooper is a British model and beauty queen who represented England at the Miss Earth 2007 pageant. In early 2009 she was crowned Miss Universe Great Britain 2009 and represented Great Britain at the Miss Universe 2009 pageant in Bahamas on 23 August 2009.
Her first major title was Miss London, held at the Hammersmith Palais in May 2006 which was presented by Richard Blackwood and Lucie Hide. This title gave her entry into the Miss England finals the same year.

Music video
In 2009, Clair starred in the music video, Faded Popstar (directed by Rob Shan Lone).

References

1982 births
Miss Universe 2009 contestants
Miss Earth 2007 contestants
Living people
English beauty pageant winners